Bahdal ibn Unayf al-Kalbi (died ) was the preeminent chief of the Banu Kalb tribe during early Muslim rule in Syria until his death in the mid-650s. A Christian like most of his tribesmen at the time, Bahdal secured a prominent role for his family and the Banu Kalb by marrying off his daughter Maysun to the future caliph Mu'awiya I, while the latter was governor of Syria between 639 and 661. Bahdal's grandchildren led the Yaman faction in the wars with Qays, a rival tribal confederation.

Life
Bahdal belonged to the Banu Kalb's princely household, the Banu Haritha ibn Janab, and served as the tribe's preeminent chieftain. Bahdal's full name and genealogy was as follows Bahdal ibn Unayf ibn Dalja ibn Qunafa ibn Adi ibn Zuhayr ibn Haritha ibn Janab ibn Qays ibn Abi Jabir ibn Zuhayr ibn Janab. He and his Bedouin tribesmen inhabited the steppes between Palmyra and Damascus by the time of the Muslim conquest of Syria in the 630s. The Banu Kalb was among the largest tribes in Syria and commanded the wider Quda'a confederation.

Though he was a Christian like most of the Banu Kalb, Bahdal forged ties with the Muslim rulers of Syria, namely from the Umayyad clan. He married off his daughter Maysun to Mu'awiya I, a member of the clan and governor of Islamic Syria. According to the historians Henri Lammens and Patricia Crone, Bahdal derived his prominence from this marriage, though he did not play a political role himself. It is not known when Bahdal was born, but he died at an old age in the mid-650s, likely before the Battle of Siffin between the partisans of the Umayyads and Caliph Ali in 657. He died a Christian, and at least one of his sons and two of his daughters also remained Christians.

Legacy
At the Battle of Siffin, Bahdal's grandson, Hassan ibn Malik, fought for Mu'awiya and commanded the Quda'a contingent. The Umayyads triumphed over their rivals and Mu'awiya became caliph in 661, moving the capital of the caliphate from Medina to Damascus. By dint of his marital links with Mu'awiya, Bahdal became "the founder of the great prosperity of the Kalbites" during Umayyad rule (661–750), according to Lammens. Mu'awiya's son and successor Yazid I was a grandson of Bahdal. Meanwhile, Hassan, his brother Sa'id and another of Bahdal's grandsons, Humayd ibn Hurayth, went on to play major roles in the Umayyad administration and military, serving as governors of various Syrian provinces, commanders of military and police units and holders of high-ranking positions in the courts of caliphs Yazid I, Mu'awiya II, Marwan I (684–685) and Abd al-Malik. Afterward, the family largely disappeared from the historical record, though members occasionally appeared as military commanders or tribal leaders until the reign of Abbasid caliph Harun al-Rashid.

Notes

References

Bibliography

650s deaths
Year of birth unknown
7th-century Arabs
Arab Christians
Banu Kalb
People from the Rashidun Caliphate
Bedouin tribal chiefs